Top Model po-russki, cycle 1 was the first installment of the Russian adaptation of Tyra Banks' America's Next Top Model. The show aired on Muz-TV from April to May 2011. In contrast to the format of the original version of Top Model, two episodes were aired per week.

The competition was hosted by Ksenia Sobchak, who also served as the head judge. The judging panel was composed of model Inna Zobova, designer Elena Suprun and photographer Mikhail Korolev. Other cast members included creative director Maxim Rapoport. Cast members from the original version such as Janice Dickinson, Jay Manuel and Tyra Banks made guest appearances on the show.

The winner of the competition was 21-year-old Mariya Lesovaya from Yekaterinburg.

Cast

Contestants
(Ages stated are at start of contest)

Judges
 Ksenia Sobchak (host)
 Mikhail Korolev
 Elena Suprun
 Inna Zobova

Episodes

Episode 1
Original airdate: April 3, 2011

TV presenter Ksenia Sobchak announced a casting for the show. After 3 months of casting and visiting 16 Russian cities, 34 beauties arrived in Moscow. The jury began the test with a runway, after which three participants were sent home.

The next morning, the girls were waiting for a photo session. Then there was an interview with the participants, where the jury members considered candidates for victory. After an interview, the jury reduced the list to 17 participants. Later in the evening, Ksenia chose 17 girls for the title of "Top Model po-russki", and the remaining 14 girls had to leave.

Special guests: Vladimir Kalinchev

Episode 2
Original airdate: April 3, 2011

17 participants were given the key to the new house from Ksenia. The bus drove up to the penthouse, and the girls began to live in it. All the girls were delighted with the new house. The girls were also surprised by the free body products Venus Embrace and Max Factor. The very next day the girls were woken up by fitness trainer Oksana Yashankina for morning exercises. Then the girls met with a team of stylists.

The first photo session stunned the girls: they had to shoot in swimsuits alone on the roof of their penthouse in the cold weather. At the first judging, the jury was very disappointed with the results of the filming. But still for Ksenia T., this photo session turned out to be a debut: her picture was recognized as the best, and Katya and Elena were in the bottom two. As Katya did not work well on her body and Elena couldn't open up completely in front of the photographer. The judge saw potential in Elena and she stayed on the show, while Katya had to be the first to leave the show.

Special guests: Oksana Yashankina, Irina Andryushkina

Episode 3
Original airdate: April 10, 2011

The next day there was a challenge in which the girls showed their runway walk in dresses to Inna Zobova and Daniil Kosenkov. Anastasia won the challenge and as a reward she received a trip to the model house of Maxim Rapoport. As a fellow traveler, she took Irina and Alyona with her. The three of them went to a model shop and got their make-up done, their nails painted, ... And since Anastasia won the challenge, she received several dresses as a gift. The next day, the "Brigade U - Nesekta!" Morning Show's hosts came to visit the girls and gave the girls presents. Then they arranged a game "Sea figure", where they had to pose for a clue to them. Valeria seemed the most best and she was invited to the Europe Plus radio station.

The second photo session was dedicated to advertising the Bruno Banani fragrance. The judging panel was more satisfied with the results than in the first week. When Ksenia D. was called, the jury found out that she starred in an advertisement for Alpen Gold products, and that is she was already known to viewers. Liza's photo was recognized as the best, and Elena again turned out to be in the bottom two along with Ksenia D.. The jury wonders why Elena came to this show when she still has bad photos and a bad walk, while Ksenia D. deceived the jury. In the end, Ksenia D.'s photo was better than Elena, and Elena was sent home. This shocked Maria, who was her friend.

Special guests: Danil Kosenkov

Episode 4
Original airdate: April 10, 2011

The day after the judging , the girls disliked Anastasia for winning the challenge and called her a fake and rude towards others, but Anastasia paid no attention to these attacks. Later, the girls arrived at the Persona-Lab salon, where they underwent a makeover. Some were very afraid for their new appearance. For example, Arina, who did not want to be a blonde. Or Karmela, who thought that her boyfriend would leave her. However, almost everyone was more or less satisfied. But Alyona refused to change her hair, as she did not want to cut her bangs.

The next day, the girls were having a make-up class and have a make-up challenge, which Evgenia T. won this challenge. This week the girls had a portrait photo shoot for Max Factor. At the judging, the jury was pleasantly surprised by the appearance of the girls. The picture of Ksenia T. was recognized as the best for the second time. In the bottom two were Alyona and Olga. As Alyona did not want to accept the makeover, while Olga's photo turned out to be sluggish and boring. But Ksenia said that this time neither she nor the jury decide who will go home, but Alyona will be the one. Ksenia ask her if she takes the scissors and cuts her bangs then she will stay, otherwise she must choose Olga's photo. At the she, Alyona choose Olga's photo, which mean Alyona went home.

Featured photographer: Mikhail Kharlamov
Special guests: Vladimir Kalinchev

Episode 5
Original airdate: April 17, 2011

The next day, the girls went to the sports center, where the gymnast Laysan Utyasheva, together with the choreographer Evgeny Papunaishvili, taught them to dance in bodysuit. Later, they have a dance challenge, Ksenia D. and Anastasia danced the best, and an additional competition was announced between them. Ksenia danced better than Anastasia and she won the challenge. As a reward, she received 50 additional shots for the next photo shoot. But unexpectedly, Laysan announces that one of the participants must leave the show right after the competition, because she did not show passion for dancing. It was Karmela, who had to go home.

This week was the scariest photo shoot for girls with snakes. Some of the girls were very scared, but they soon calmed down and the photo session went well. At this judging, the photo of Maria was not discussed. The photograph of Ksenia V. was recognized as the best. Ksenia D. and Maria remained in the bottom two. The jury did not like Maria's behavior during the shooting, while Ksenia D. had the worst photos even though she had 50 extra frames. The jury saw potential in Maria, and Ksenia D. left the show.

Featured photographer: Igor Vasiliadis
Special guests: Lyasan Utiasheva & Evgeny Papunaishvili

Episode 6
Original airdate: April 17, 2011

The next morning, the girls arrived at Winzavod and they were in for a surprise: supermodel Janice Dickinson became the guest of this week. She taught girls the "wisdom" of posing. One of the girls did not have "heels" with her, and Inna Zobova had to give that girl her shoes, but Janice scolded the girl. According to the results of this masterclass came with a posing challenge, Irina won. She had the opportunity to share her prize with one girl, and she chose Anastasia. And the prize was a private dinner with Janice in the most expensive hotel complex in Moscow, Ararat Park Hyatt Moscow. At dinner, Janice gave Irina and Anastasia some useful advice.

This week at the photo shoot, the girls portrayed the signs of the zodiac. Janice Dickinson was the special guest at the judging. The photograph of Irina was recognized as the best. Janice insisted on the expulsion of Valeria, since she did not consider her a model. Valeria and Liza were in the bottom two. As Valeria has potential, but she doesn't was able to open it, while Liza has a bright and memorable appearance, but she lacks work on herself. The jury gave Liza a chance and she stayed and Valeria had to leave the show. The girls did not hold back their emotions when she was eliminated.

Featured photographer: Igor Vasiliadis
Special guests: Janice Dickinson

Episode 7
Original airdate: April 24, 2011

In the morning, fitness trainers Oksana Yashankina and Sergey Isai came to the girls. The girls went to a military base, where they were tested for their physical fitness, and they had to go through an obstacle course. Evgenia T. showed the best score and she won the challenge. Then the girls moved to the podium on the roof of the bus in front of a platoon of soldiers. Maria was declared the winner of this challenge and she was given the opportunity to travel to Cosmopolitan's headquarters. She chose Masha and Arina as her companions.

The next morning, the girls came to the studio, where they began their photo shoot in the style of "Body Art". Russian rapper Timati came to the photo shoot. All the girls worked well, especially Anastasia, who was the photographer's favorite. At the judging , Anastasia's photo was recognized as the best. In the bottom two were Ksenia V. and Ksenia T.. As Ksenia V.'s photo was boring, while Ksenia T.'s photo was not bad, but her mood at the judging was unacceptable. Photo of Ksenia T. was better, and Ksenia V. was eliminated from the show .

Featured photographer: Igor Vasiliadis
Special guests: Alya Badanina

Episode 8
Original airdate: April 24, 2011

The next morning the girls were told that they were going to ride horses. But for Evgenia F., the skating nearly ended in tragedy when she fell off her horse. When the horseback riding was over, the girls arrived on the runway podium of Maxim Rapoport, but the girls had to go blindfolded. This news shocked all the girls. Daniil Kosenkov was also at this time and he wanted to see if the girls were progressing or not. Anastasia was chosen to open the show and Masha completed the show. Maria won this challenge. As a reward, she received participation in the autumn fashion show from Grazia magazine.

The next day, the girls arrived at a large SPA center for an underwater photo session for Pantene Aqua Light. At the judging, Olga asked the jury to change her makeover, to which they agreed. When showing a photo of Irina, she stated that the girls did not want her to stay on the show, which aroused suspicion in Ksenia. The jury was impressed by the photo of Ksenia T., and she again became the best. Arina and Maria were in the bottom two. As Arina's photo was unsuccessful, the jury believes that Arina is naughty a lot, and she gave up. While the jury didn't like Masha's performance this week as she is praised at the challenge, but her photo turned out bad. The jury saw potential in Masha, and Arina had to be sent home.

Featured photographer: Mikhail Kharlamov
Special guests: Daniel Kosenkov

Episode 9
Original airdate: May 2, 2011

After the elimination, the girls suspect that Irina Adadurova started a game, and she claims that she is the best. This week the girls went to Moscow State University, where Ksenia taught them how to give interviews and how to present themselves to the press. Then the girls were taken to one of the restaurants in Moscow, where they were met by the famous Russian journalist Leonid Zakoshansky. With each of the girls he had a personal conversation. Leonid was very pleased with some of the girls, especially Masha and the Timofeeva twins, Ksenia T. and Olga. Masha was declared the winner. The prize for her was participation in the Melbourne spring fashion week as a reporter. But suddenly Leonid announced that one of the girls should immediately leave the show for having the worst performance in this challenge. This was Anastasia, who did not impress Leonid at all, and she had to leave.

Then the girls went to the central street Arbat of Moscow, where they had a photo session called "Paparazzi Venus". At the judging, the jury really liked the photo of Maria, they begin to notice that she is becoming more feminine, and she was recognized as the best. The worst were Evgenia T. and Liza. As Evgenia at the photoshoots uses the same image, but outside of this image she is lost. While Liza got an unsuccessful photo and interview at the challenge. Evgenia T. was given a chance, while Liza was eliminated.

Featured photographer: Natalia Arefyeva

Episode 10
Original airdate: May 2, 2011

This episode showed interesting moments that did not air, also showed appearances as guests of celebrities.

Episode 11
Original airdate: May 9, 2011

The girls were visited by Maxim Rapoport. He appointed them a challenge in which the girls should dance one at a time and at the same time they should fully open up, throw out their grievances, rejoice, ... Irina after the dance asked all the girls for forgiveness if she did something offended. But this did not hurt Masha, and after the challenge there were skirmishes between her and Irina. Then the girls went to the theater, where the actor Vadim Medvedev gave them a similar task. They had to be liberated, stop being ordinary people. They showed different scenes that Vadim called them. Masha Minogarova won this challenge. She was rewarded a trip to the Cosmo fashion party, where single suitors will be gathered. Masha took with her fellow travelers Maria and Evgenia F..

This week, the girls were waiting for the photo session of The Seven Deadly Sins. At the judging , Evgenia T.'s photo was recognized as the best. The Timofeeva sisters, Ksenia T. and Olga, remained in the bottom two. As Ksenia, the jury thought her good photos were obtained by chance. While the photograph of Olga was not bad, but her runway walked terribly. But the jury saw more progress in Olga, and Ksenia T. had to go home.

Featured photographer: Mikhail Korolev
Special guests: Vadim Medvedev

Episode 12
Original airdate: May 9, 2011

In the morning the girls were visited by Inna Zobova with the sex symbol of the USSR, Elena Kondulainen. Inna arranged a challenge in the house, as the girls had to put on their personal belongings and walk through a small fashion show. Evgenia F. became the winner. As a reward, she received a dinner at a good restaurant.

This week the girls had a photo shoot in the style of Pin-up. At the judging, Ksenia announces that the girls are flying to New York City, but one will have to go home. The photograph of Eugenia F., who won the challenge, was recognized as the best. In the top two were Evgenia T. and Masha. As Evgenia T. in all photos, one and the same image. While the jury is disappointed that Masha can not concentrate on the photographs. None of Masha's photos this week showed a normal face. But the jury believed in Masha, and she and the rest of the participants will go to New York City. Evgenia T. had to leave not for New York City, but for Samara.

Featured photographer: Mikhail Korolev
Special guests: Vladimir Kalinichev

Episode 13
Original airdate: May 15, 2011

After Evgenia T. left the competition, the remaining five girls arrive in New York City. The girls were placed in a new penthouse. On the same day, they met with Karen Lee in Central Park to talk about their strengths and weaknesses. Later, the girls met with the casting director and each girl talked to him one on one. Maria won the challenge and chose Masha for a helicopter flight over Manhattan.

Then the girls have a photo shoot on the roof. At the judging, Evgenia F.'s photo became the best. Masha and Olga remained in the bottom two. The jury didn't like Masha's face in the photo, but Olga got a bad photo because she didn't talk about her problems. But still a photo of Masha recognized much better than Olga. Olga had to return to Russia.

Featured photographer: Michael Keal
Special guests: Kristin Inderson, Angel Sanchez, Maksim Rapoport

Episode 14
Original airdate: May 15, 2011

In the morning Maxim Rapoport visited the girls. He gave them the task of visiting the editorial office of Cosmopolitan magazine. In the editorial office, the girls met with the designer of the Cosmopolitan magazine, already known to them, Kristin Inderson, who was on the judging in the previous episode. She told the girls to prepare a portfolio. But Evgenia F. came without a portfolio, because she forgot to take it. Kristin gave them a task to go-see with different designers and whoever gets the most offers wins. As a result, Maria won again.

This week at the photo session the girls portrayed images of the most famous sex symbols of America. At the photo shoot, the girls were again in for a surprise as they met the famous Canadian stylist Jay Manuel. Jay himself, when he saw them, was very impressed with Russian girls, and he even took part in the photo shoot. Jay Manuel was the special guest at the judging. The photograph of Maria was recognized as the best, and Evgenia F. and Masha remained in the bottom two. As the jury did not like the photo of Evgenia F. and her behavior at the photo shoot, while Masha also had a bad photo. But in Evgenia F., the jury saw more potential. As a result, Masha went home.

Featured photographer: Michael Keal
Special guests: Jay Manuel, Angel Sanchez, Anna Rykova

Episode 15
Original airdate: May 22, 2011

This episode is a more detailed version of episode 10, showed moments that were not aired, and also talked about the 3 remaining girls - Evgenia Frank, Irina Adadurova and Maria Lesovaya.

Episode 16
Original airdate: May 22, 2011

The remaining three girls starred in video commercials for Max Factor products together with Vladimir Kalinchev. During the judging, the jury noticed that Irina was thinking about the text all the time, but still her work was declared the best. Evgenia F. and Maria remained in the bottom two. The jury sees that Evgenia F. is a beautiful girl, but they believe that she should be able to give out not only beautiful photos, but also to act in a video, which they considered not the most successful. In the advertisement, the jury did not see a model in Maria, but she performed well in it. Nevertheless, the jury saw more potential in Maria. Eugenia F. had to return to Russia.

The next day, the remaining two girls took part in the last photo shoot for the cover of Cosmopolitan magazine. Maxim Rapoport was delighted with both of them. The day after, the two finalists arrived at the judging room. The final guest judge was Roman Young . The jury really liked the work of Maria. They noticed with what enthusiasm she worked. However, the jury was also amazed by the works of Irina. They noticed that many can envy Irina's work people and models. At the last meeting, Roman Yang saw more zest in Maria than in Irina. The jury agreed with him. However, Irina did an excellent job throughout the show, never finishing in the bottom two. However, the jury found it very difficult to make a decision.. The girls were invited , and Maria was declared the first winner of "Top Model po-russki".

Special guests: Anna Rykova, Maksim Rapaport, Roman Yang

Results

 The contestant was eliminated
 The contestant quit the competition
 The contestant was eliminated outside of judging panel
 The contestant won the competition performance

Shoots guide

 Episode 1 photo shoot: Show yourself (casting)
 Episode 2 photo shoot: Swimsuits on the rooftop
 Episode 3 photo shoot: Posing with a male model for Bruno Banani perfume campaign
 Episode 4 photo shoot: Beauty shots for Max Factor
 Episode 5 photo shoot: Posing with a snake
 Episode 6 photo shoot: Zodiac signs
 Episode 7 photo shoot: Garden of Eden
 Episode 8 photo shoot: Underwater shots for Pantene
 Episode 9 photo shoot: Paparazzi girls for Gillette Venus
 Episode 11 photo shoot: Seven deadly sins
 Episode 12 photo shoot: Pin-up style
 Episode 13 photo shoot: Posing on a rooftop
 Episode 14 photo shoot: Portraying American celebrities
Episode 16 shoots: Max Factor Smoky Eye Effect Cream Eyeshadow & False Lash Effect Mascara video ad; Cosmopolitan covers

Makeovers

 Karmela - Dyed honey blonde
 Ksenia D. - Dyed maroon, bangs added
 Valeria - Short haircut trimmed shorter on one side; later, cut more shorter
 Ksenia V. - Extensions added, dyed honey blonde
 Arina - Dyed dark brown, bangs added
 Anastasia - Dyed honey blonde
 Liza - Black bob haircut
 Ksenia T. - Cut to the shoulder-length, dyed blonde, eyebrows bleached
 Evgenia T. - Dyed dark brown
 Olga - Bob haircut; later, dyed red
Masha - Dyed honey blonde
Evgenia F. - Bangs added
Irina - Dyed chocolate brown
Maria - Cut shorter

References

Top Model series (Russia)
2011 Russian television seasons